Estonian Handball Association (abbreviation EHA) is one of the sport governing bodies in Estonia which deals with handball.

EHF is established on 24 November 1990 in Tallinn. EHF is a successor of Estonian SSR Handball Federation.

EHF is a member of International Handball Federation (IHF) since 1991.

References

External links
 

Sports governing bodies in Estonia
Handball in Estonia
European Handball Federation